Laffont may refer to:

People
 Axelle Laffont (born 1970), French actress and comedienne
 Eliane Laffont (born 1944), U.S. image consultant
 Jean-Jacques Laffont (1947–2004), French economist
 Jean-Pierre Laffont (born 1935), Algerian-French-American photojournalist
 Patrice Laffont (born 1939), French TV personality
 Perrine Laffont (born 1998). French freestyle skier
 Robert Laffont (1916–2010), founder of Éditions Robert Laffont

Other uses
 Éditions Robert Laffont (est. 1941, in France), a book publisher
 Jean-Jacques Laffont Foundation, a private economics research foundation of France

See also

 Lafont (surname)
 Fontaine (disambiguation)
 Font (disambiguation)